Down on the Farm is a 1941 American short animated film directed by Tex Avery as the first entry in the Speaking of Animals short film series which Avery created for Paramount Pictures. It was nominated for an Academy Award at the 14th Academy Awards for Best Short Subject (One-Reel).

References

External links
 

1941 films
1941 animated films
1940s animated short films
1940s American animated films
American animated short films
American black-and-white films
Films directed by Tex Avery
Paramount Pictures short films
1940s English-language films